Jennifer L. Roberts is an American art historian. She serves as Elizabeth Cary Agassiz Professor of the Humanities and Johnson-Kulukunkdis Family Faculty Director of the Arts at the Radcliffe Institute for Advanced Study at Harvard University. Her research and teaching focuses on American art from the colonial period to the present.

Education 
Roberts attended Stanford University as an undergraduate, where she initially studied human biology before ultimately double-majoring in English and art history, though she did not begin the latter until her senior year. She graduated Phi Beta Kappa in 1992. She then earned an M.A. and Ph.D. from Yale University, graduating in 2000.

Career 
Roberts became an assistant professor at Harvard University in 2002.

Roberts’s first book, Mirror-Travels, explored the work of Robert Smithson, who created the Spiral Jetty in the Great Salt Lake, Utah.

In 2021, Roberts delivered the seventieth A. W. Mellon Lectures in the Fine Arts.

Works
 Mirror-Travels: Robert Smithson and History (Yale University Press, 2004) , 
 American Encounters: Art, History, and Cultural Identity (Prentice Hall, 2007) , 
 Jasper Johns/In Press: The Crosshatch Works and the Logic of Print (Harvard Art Museums, 2012) , 
 Transporting Visions: the Movement of Images in Early America (University of California Press, 2014) ,

References

Living people
Women art historians
Stanford University alumni
Yale University alumni
Harvard University faculty
1969 births
Slade Professors of Fine Art (University of Cambridge)